Sadie Anne Stanley (born November 15, 2001) is an American actress and singer, who began her career as the titular role in the 2019 Disney Channel original movie, Kim Possible. She is also known for her recurring role as Brea Bee on The Goldbergs, as well as starring in the films The Sleepover (2020) and Let Us In (2021).

Early life
Stanley was born in Columbia, South Carolina, to Tracy and Matt Stanley. She has a twin sister, Sophie. Stanley became interested in acting when she was 13.
She was an actor for Columbia Children’s Theatre. One of her notable performances was as Young Princess Fiona in Shrek.

Career
Stanley sang an updated version of the Kim Possible theme song "Call Me, Beep Me!" for the live-action movie, in which she also played the titular character. She has also appeared in several shows, including Game Shakers and The Goldbergs. Since 2020, Stanley has appeared on ABC sitcom The Goldbergs as Brea Bee, love interest and girlfriend of the show's main character, Adam Goldberg (played by her Kim Possible co-star Sean Giambrone). She played Parker, girlfriend of Jen's (played by Christina Applegate) oldest son, Charlie, on the second season of Netflix's Dead to Me.

Filmography

Film

Television

References

External links
 

21st-century American actresses
American child actresses
Actresses from Columbia, South Carolina
Living people
2001 births